107.3 HFM (call sign: 6HFM) is a community radio station that broadcasts on 107.3 MHz FM from its studios at 44 Mills Road West in Gosnells, Western Australia. It broadcasts a wide range of locally produced music and information programs.

The station commenced broadcasting on 26 January 1998 from studios in Orchard Avenue, Armadale, Western Australia on the 93.7 MHz FM frequency and continued on that frequency until it switched to its current 107.3 MHz FM frequency in 2002.  Perth commercial radio station Nova 937 now broadcasts on the 93.7 MHz FM frequency.

In 2007, the station began live streaming to the internet and continues to do so today.

External links
 107.3 HFM
 HFM

Radio stations in Perth, Western Australia